The White Boys is a 1916 British silent drama film directed by Frank Wilson and starring Stewart Rome, Chrissie White and Lionelle Howard.

Cast
 Stewart Rome
 Chrissie White
 Lionelle Howard

References

Bibliography
 Palmer, Scott. British Film Actors' Credits, 1895-1987. McFarland, 1988.

External links

1916 films
1916 drama films
British drama films
British silent feature films
Films directed by Frank Wilson
Films set in England
British black-and-white films
1910s English-language films
1910s British films
Silent drama films